The Iced Bullet is a 1917 American silent mystery film directed by Reginald Barker and starring William Desmond, Robert McKim and J. Barney Sherry. The film's sets were designed by the art director Robert Brunton.

Cast
 William Desmond as The Author / Horace Lee
 Robert McKim as Donald Greene
 J. Barney Sherry as Richard Deering
 Margaret Thompson as Evelyn Deering
 Joseph J. Dowling as The Butler 
 Jerome Storm as Butler's Son
 Louis Durham as Joe
 J. Frank Burke as The Specialist
 Reginald Barker as Self
 C. Gardner Sullivan as Self

References

Bibliography
 Langman, Larry. American Film Cycles: The Silent Era. Greenwood Publishing, 1998.

External links
 

1917 films
1917 mystery films
American silent feature films
American mystery films
American black-and-white films
Triangle Film Corporation films
Films directed by Reginald Barker
1910s English-language films
1910s American films
Silent mystery films